Cole Hocker (born June 6, 2001) is an American middle and long-distance runner. He competed collegiately for the University of Oregon, where he won multiple NCAA titles. Hocker announced in 2021 he would forgo his remaining NCAA eligibility to run professionally, signing to run under Nike.

Running career

High school
Hocker grew up in Indianapolis, Indiana, and attended Cathedral High School. In high school he was second in the 2017 IHSAA Cross Country State Finals & won in '18. He also won the 2018 Foot Locker Cross Country Championships and finished second at the 2018 Nike Cross Nationals.

College
Hocker ran for the Oregon Ducks. At the 2021 NCAA Division I Indoor Track and Field Championships, he won the mile in 3:53.71 and the 3000 metres in 7:46.15. Earlier that year, he ran a personal best of 3:50.55 in the mile on February 12, 2021, finishing in a close second to teammate Cooper Teare at a meet at the Randal Tyson Track Center. The two set the 7th and 8th all-time fastest times for the indoor mile.

At the 2021 NCAA Division I Outdoor Track and Field Championships, he won the 1500 metres in a time of 3:35.35, outkicking NCAA record holder Yared Nuguse. He also finished 4th in the 5000 metres in a time of 13:18.95.

At the 2020 United States Olympic Trials, Hocker won the 1500 m final ahead of Matthew Centrowitz and Yared Nuguse. Hocker did not have the Olympic qualifying time, however he qualified for the games based on his world ranking position.

At the 2020 Olympic Games, Hocker placed 6th in the 1500 metre event with a time of 3:31.40, setting a new personal best. His time was under the Olympic Record set 2 days prior in the semifinals by Abel Kipsang of Kenya. Hocker qualified for the semifinals by running 3:36.16 for 4th in his heat. Hocker then ran 3:33.87, his then personal best, for 2nd in his semifinal to qualify for the final.

Professional
On September 13, 2021, Hocker announced his decision to turn professional, forgoing his further participation on the University of Oregon team. Hocker became a Nike-sponsored athlete, and continues to be based in Oregon training under coach Ben Thomas. Hocker made his professional debut at the 2022 Millrose Games, where he competed in the 3,000 meter race. He ran a personal record of 7:39.83, placing third behind Geordie Beamish and teammate Cooper Teare. Two weeks later at Gately Park in Chicago, in a bid for the American indoor mile record of 3:49.98, Teare and Hocker ran personal bests of 3:50.17 and 3:50.35 to place first and second.

At the 2022 USA Indoor Track and Field Championships in Spokane, Washington, Hocker doubled in the 1,500 meter and 3,000 meter events. He earned his second and third national titles, running a meet record time of 3:39.09 in the 1500m. However, he opted out of the 2022 World Athletics Indoor Championships in Belgrade, turning his focus instead to the outdoor championships in July.  An injury at the US National Track and Field championships in June 2022, prevented him from qualifying in the 1500M for the World Outdoor Championships.

References

External links 
 
 
 
 
 

2001 births
Living people
American male long-distance runners
Oregon Ducks men's track and field athletes
Place of birth missing (living people)
Track and field athletes from Indianapolis
American male middle-distance runners
USA Outdoor Track and Field Championships winners
Athletes (track and field) at the 2020 Summer Olympics
Olympic track and field athletes of the United States
21st-century American people
Track and field athletes from Indiana